Edward Jan Römer (14 May 1806, Vilnius – 15 May 1878, Vilnius) was a Polish writer, translator, social activist and painter. He was the father of the artists Alfred Izydor Römer, from his first marriage, to Anna Monwid-Białozor (1805–1834), and Edward Mateusz Römer, from his second marriage, to Anna's sister, Zofia (1817–1893). His father was the politician Michał Józef Römer.

Biography
He was the son of Michał Józef Römer and Rachela de Reas. He initially studied painting at Vilnius University with Jan Rustem. 

During the November Uprising, he became associated with the Central Insurrection Committee. In 1833, he was imprisoned and sentenced to banishment for life in Vologda, but was given permission to return after only a year. In 1834, he worked with Adam Jerzy Czartoryski, known as the "King" of those in exile, towards the goal of re-establishing the Polish–Lithuanian Commonwealth. 

In 1838, he was imprisoned again for his association with the exiled radical, Szymon Konarski, and was sentenced to death. His sentence was commuted to exile in Vologda. This time, he remained until 1852. His son, Edward, was born there. After returning, he was under constant police surveillance. 

Later, he became the director of the local branch of the Benevolent Society. He was also a member of the Museum of Antiquities in Vilnius and the Archaeological Commission. During the January Uprising, he was held under house arrest. In his later life, he wrote epigrams and memoirs of famous contemporaries, did translations, and painted portraits of his family.

Sources 
Wyprawa do wód z Litwy do Normandii, pages from his journal; collected in 1861. Edited and with an introduction by Danuta Kamolowa.

External links

1806 births
1878 deaths
Römer family
Baltic-German people
November Uprising participants
Polish writers